Carlo Scotti (born 11 May 1904, date of death unknown) was an Italian boxer who competed in the 1924 Summer Olympics. In 1924 he was eliminated in the first round of the heavyweight class after losing his fight to the upcoming silver medalist Søren Petersen.

References

External links
profile

1904 births
Year of death missing
Heavyweight boxers
Olympic boxers of Italy
Boxers at the 1924 Summer Olympics
Italian male boxers
20th-century Italian people